Hoekwil is a town in Garden Route District Municipality in the Western Cape province of South Africa.

References

Populated places in the George Local Municipality